K.M. Cherian (born 8 March 1942), in full Kotturathu Mammen Cherian, is an Indian heart surgeon. He performed India's first coronary artery bypass surgery and first heart transplant. and is considered a pioneer of pediatric cardiac surgery in the country. He is also a former honorary surgeon to the President of India and a Padma Shri awardee.

Career as surgeon
He attended Kasturba Medical College, Manipal. He performed India's first coronary artery bypass surgery in 1975 at Southern Railway Headquarters hospital, Perambur, Chennai. He is the founder of Frontier Lifeline Hospital, where he performed India's second heart transplant surgery in 1995. He also performed the country's first heart-lung transplant and the country's first pediatric cardiac surgery.

Awards and honours :-

He was awarded Padma Shri by the Government of India in 1991, and was honorary surgeon to the President of India from 1990 to 1993.

In June 2000, Cherian received a lifetime achievement award from Kasturba Medical College for contributions made to the field of cardiothoracic surgery in India.

He received a Harvard Medical Excellence Award in 2005, through a panel organised by Harvard Medical School.

His name is engraved in one of the stones at Kos Island, Greece along with three other Indian surgeons, on the occasion of the 18th World Congress held by the World Society of Cardio Thoracic Surgeons held between 30 April3 May 2008.

In 2010, Cherian became the first Indian to be designated president of the World Society of Cardio Thoracic Surgeons.

In May 2016, Cherian was selected to be a member of the "Founder Circle" of the American Association for Thoracic Surgery.

Business Ventures 
He and several other investors set up a hospital in Chengannur, Kerala. It was inaugurated in March 2021. It sits on a 5-acre plot. The name of the hospital is Dr KM Cherian institute of medical sciences.

Biography
A biography about Cherian titled Hand of God was released in 2015.

References

Further reading

External links
 Profile on Frontier Lifeline Hospital official website
 October 2017 interview
 October 2010 interview
 

Indian cardiac surgeons
Living people
Malayali people
Medical doctors from Chennai
Recipients of the Padma Shri in medicine
Fellows of the Royal Australasian College of Surgeons
20th-century Indian medical doctors
1942 births
20th-century surgeons